During the 2002–03 English football season, Wimbledon competed in the Football League First Division. It was their third consecutive season at this level.

Players

First-team squad

Left club during season

References

Notes

Wimbledon F.C. seasons
Wimbledon